MYE, Mye or mye may refer to:

 Miyakejima Airport, Japan (IATA code MYE)
 Myene language, spoken in Gabon (ISO639 code mye)
 Mye, a song in the album Wiretap Scars by Sparta